This was the first edition of the tournament.

Jiří Lehečka won the title after defeating Filip Horanský 6–3, 6–2 in the final.

Seeds

Draw

Finals

Top half

Bottom half

References

External links
Main draw
Qualifying draw

Bucharest Challenger - 1